204 (North Irish) Field Hospital is a unit of the Royal Army Medical Corps within the Army Reserve of the British Army.

History
The hospital was formed upon the formation of the TAVR in 1967, as the 204 (North Irish) General Hospital. Throughout the Cold War, the hospital was under the command of 107th (Ulster) Brigade; and on transfer to war, would re-subordinate to Commander Medical 1 (BR) Corps, and provide 800 beds. During the reforms implemented after the Cold War, the hospital was re-designated as 204 (North Irish) Field Hospital. As a consequence of Army 2020, the unit now falls under 2nd Medical Brigade, and is paired with 34 Field Hospital.

Under the Future Soldier programme, the hospital will amalgamate with 253rd (North Irish) Medical Regiment to form the new 210th (North Irish) Multi-Role Medical Regiment by 2023.  The new regiment will fall under 2nd Medical Group.

Current Structure
The hospital's current structure is as follows:
Headquarters, at Belfast
A Detachment, at Belfast
B Detachment, at Lowfield Camp, Ballymena
C Detachment, at Newtownards
D Detachment, at Armagh

References

Military units and formations established in 1967
Units of the Royal Army Medical Corps